Jeff Irwin (born September 12, 1977) is an American musician and multi-instrumentalist. He has performed with Griffin House, Cerys Matthews, Derek Webb and Sandra McCracken, Mat Kearney, Taylor Sorensen & the Trigger Code, and Counting Crows.

Early life
Born in Creve Coeur, Missouri, Irwin grew up in St. Louis County. Growing up, he studied piano, violin (learning the Suzuki method), viola, trumpet, guitar, bass guitar, contrabass, baritone horn, and various synthesizers. Irwin also received vocal training by participating in various area choirs. He wrote and performed an overture for his 4th grade class' musical production of Magellan.

Education and career 
In high school, he formed his first band, The Mafia. The band was focused on both performing cover songs and writing original music. They sometimes doubled as an instrumental jazz combo, playing parties and corporate functions. This was a catalyst for his involvement in school orchestras, jazz ensembles, choirs, and musical productions.

In college, Irwin performed more as a bassist than as a singer/songwriter. From 1996 to 1999, while living in Bolivar and Springfield, Missouri, he played in a ska band as well as various jazz groups. In 1999, he moved to Nashville, Tennessee to attend Belmont University. He immediately began writing and performing with numerous groups, from rock bands to orchestras.

Since 2008, Irwin has collaborated with The Deep Vibration, Griffin House, Tristen, The Bittersweets, Roman Candle, The Nashville Jazz Group, Thad Cockrell, Andrew Peterson, Randall Goodgame, Stephen Gordon,  Sandra McCracken, Keegan DeWitt, Caitlin Rose, Andrew Combs, Rayland Baxter, Shelly Colvin, among others.

Influences
Irwin cites John Entwistle, Tony Levin, Matt Malley, John Paul Jones, and Adam Clayton as the bassists who have most influenced his musical style.

Selected recordings
 Taylor Sorensen's The Overflow, 2003
Griffin House's Homecoming, 2006
Cerys Matthews' Never Said Goodbye, 2006
Landon Pigg Coffeeshop',' 2008 
Peter Bradley Adams Leavetaking, 2008
Roman Candle's Oh Tall Tree in the Ear 2009
Thad Cockrell's To Be Loved LP 2009
Griffin House's The Learner'' 2010

References

1977 births
Living people
American double-bassists
Male double-bassists
People from St. Louis County, Missouri
People from Bolivar, Missouri
People from Springfield, Missouri
21st-century double-bassists
21st-century American bass guitarists
21st-century American male musicians